Pontefract Baghill railway station is one of the three railway stations that serves the town of Pontefract, West Yorkshire, England.

History 

The station was opened together with the Ferrybridge to Moorthorpe section of the Swinton and Knottingley Joint Railway. Public passenger train services began on 1 July 1879, freight traffic had already started by then. The design of the station followed basic principles of the North Eastern Railway, it was, however, larger than the other stations opened on the line at the same time.
Pontefract Baghill was also once linked to the Wakefield, Pontefract & Goole main line by means of a short chord to  near the intersection of the two lines as shown on the accompanying RCH map. This connection closed in November 1964, but the bay platform it once used at the northern end can still be made out.  Two short curves north of the station near Ferrybridge connect the Dearne Valley Line to the western end of Knottingley station westbound and the eastern end of Monkhill station (both on the Pontefract Line), but are now only in use for freight and diverted passenger services.

In the Strategic Rail Authority's 2002/3 financial year, only 15 people bought tickets for journeys from Pontefract Baghill station, and 21 bought tickets for journeys ending there, making it the sixth least busy station in the United Kingdom at that time. The annual usage in recent years is still considerably lower than that of Monkhill and Tanshelf stations.

Facilities
The station has very basic amenities - it is unstaffed and has no ticketing provision of any kind, so anyone travelling from here needs to buy their ticket on the train or in advance of travel.  The only other facilities offered are bench seating, a public telephone and timetable information posters (the old main building still stands but is in private use).  Step-free access is available to both platforms.  Neither platform has any shelter; though it is possible to wait under the passage in the former station building on the York bound platform.

Services 

The low level of usage can be attributed to there being only six trains each day (four on Sundays), three serving the station northbound to York and three southbound to Sheffield, at times that are not favourable to commuters.  Furthermore, the neighbouring cities of Leeds and Wakefield cannot be reached by direct services from the station.

From the May 2019 timetable change, an additional service in each direction has been introduced on Mondays to Saturdays (15:37 northbound to York, 17:49 southbound to Sheffield).

References and notes

Literature 
 Body, G. (1988), PSL Field Guides - Railways of the Eastern Region Volume 2, Patrick Stephens Ltd, Wellingborough,

External links 
 

  The station in 2010.

Railway stations in Wakefield
DfT Category F1 stations
Former Swinton and Knottingley Joint Railway stations
Railway stations in Great Britain opened in 1879
Northern franchise railway stations
Pontefract